Farid Talhaoui (born 10 February 1982 in Angers) is a footballer who is currently playing for JS Saint-Pierroise.

International career
He was part of the Moroccan 2004 Olympic football team, who exited in the first round, finishing third in group D, behind group winners Iraq and runners-up Costa Rica.

References

External links
 
 Farid Talhaoui at Footballdatabase

1982 births
Living people
Sportspeople from Angers
Moroccan footballers
Morocco youth international footballers
Olympic footballers of Morocco
French footballers
Riffian people
En Avant Guingamp players
FC Lorient players
Wydad AC players
Footballers at the 2004 Summer Olympics
Association football forwards
French sportspeople of Moroccan descent
Ligue 1 players
Olympique Club de Khouribga players
Lyon La Duchère players
Footballers from Pays de la Loire